The Last Night (French: La dernière nuit) is a 1934 French comedy film directed by Jacques de Casembroot and starring Florelle, José Noguéro and Kissa Kouprine.

Cast
 Florelle as Evelyne Ebert
 José Noguéro as Paul Gérard
 Kissa Kouprine as Mimosa
 Jim Gérald as Mathias Krug
 Georges Péclet as Bob
 Marc-Hély as 	Ernest
 Georges Térof	
 Peggy Vère 		
 Windrow
 Frédéric Mariotti

References

Bibliography 
 Rège, Philippe . Encyclopedia of French Film Directors, Volume 1. Scarecrow Press, 2009.

External links 
 

1934 films
1934 comedy films
French comedy  films
1930s French-language films
Films directed by Jacques de Casembroot
1930s French films